Talmei Menashe is a moshav in central Israel. It was established in 1953 by the General Zionists movement. The moshav encompasses 1,800 dunams and consists of 62 farms, 5 auxiliary farms, and a residential annex ("Harchava"). The moshav falls under the jurisdiction of Be'er Ya'akov local council, and is located to the east of Be'er Ya'akov and to the west of route 44.

History
The moshav was established on the lands of the Palestinian  village of Abu al-Fadl, which was  depopulated during the 1948 Arab–Israeli War; the building that served as the headquarters of Hasan Salama is on the village's farmland. It was named after Menashe Meirovitch, a member of Bilu and a politician, who was dubbed "last of the Bilus" as he was the last surviving Bilu member, living long enough to see the foundation of Israel.

The first residents arrived in 1953, and mainly raised poultry, cattle and planted citrus and apricots.

In 2006, some of the farmland of the moshav was transferred to Be'er Ya'akov to build a residential neighborhood.

References

Populated places in Central District (Israel)
Populated places established in 1953
1953 establishments in Israel
Moshavim